Robert Charles Kerman (December 16, 1947 – December 27, 2018), also known as R. Bolla, was an American actor who had a noted pornographic acting career during what is considered to be the "golden age" period of the porn film industry during the mid-1970s to the early/mid-1980s. As R. Bolla (or Richard Bolla, a pun on slang terms for penis and testicles), he appeared in well over 100 pornographic films, most famously Debbie Does Dallas (1978). He was one of few adult performers to have an appreciable mainstream acting career, with his most widely known leading role being Professor Harold Monroe in the controversial horror film Cannibal Holocaust (1980).

Early life
Born in the Brooklyn borough of New York City, New York, he grew up in a middle-class Italian neighborhood of Bensonhurst. Kerman graduated from Brooklyn College in 1970. While in college, he began his acting career and appeared in numerous Off-Broadway plays. Later he also studied acting at the American Academy of Dramatic Arts.

Adult film career
Kerman's onscreen sex appearances began with director Roberta Findlay's Anyone But My Husband. He became one of the most prolific male stars of the Golden Age of Porn. Unlike many of his adult-industry peers, Kerman bitterly regretted his participation in the adult film industry, especially being in the film Debbie Does Dallas, which he felt ruined any prospect of him attaining mainstream acting success. He stated: "In retrospect I'm really sorry that I did it, because I probably ruined the best years of my life as an actor." He was inducted into the AVN Hall of Fame in 1998. He performed in 230 films.

Film career
Although his professional career began in adult films, Kerman was a trained actor who played minor parts in such mainstream productions such as The Goodbye Girl (1977) and Concorde Affaire '79. In the 1980s, he starred in several Italian horror films, including Ruggero Deodato's Cannibal Holocaust, and Umberto Lenzi's cannibal films Mangiati Vivi and Cannibal Ferox. Still, he remained active in pornography throughout the first half of the decade, with roles including Lawyer Quim in Liquid A$$ets (1982), and Fritz von Holenwohl in the Henri Pachard directed Public Affairs (1984). In 1985, attempting to work solely in mainstream productions, he obtained a Hollywood agent and went on to play supporting roles in television series such as Hill Street Blues and Simon & Simon, In 1987 he appeared in the film No Way Out. However, he also continued to appear in pornographic cinema and was dropped by his agent. Unable to find work and feeling betrayed, he slid into years of depression and substance abuse.

Cannibal Holocaust
In the DVD commentary for Cannibal Holocaust (in interview with Sage Stallone and Bob Murawski), Kerman described film director Ruggero Deodato as "remorseless" and "uncaring". Incensed by the realization during filming that an animal's death was not being faked, Kerman physically tackled the director and stormed off the set. He was not present when other animals, including a coatimundi, were killed. Kerman was also a guest for the film's 35th-anniversary screening at the Alamo Drafthouse Cinema in Yonkers, New York, on February 28, 2015.

Later career
In the 2000s, Kerman played a sea captain in Sam Raimi's Spider-Man, and Dr. Monroe in the drama short Vic, directed by Sage Stallone. He made personal appearances at horror conventions to speak about his experiences on Cannibal Holocaust. Kerman died on December 27, 2018, at the age of 71 of complications of diabetes.

Filmography (selection)

1975: Anyone But My Husband (as Robert Kerr) - Director: Roberta Findlay
1976: Blow Dry (as Richard Bolla) – Director: David Secter
1976: Sex Wish – Director: Zebedy Colt & Victor Milt
1977: Punk Rock (as Richard Bolla) – Director: Carter Stevens
1977: Inside Jennifer Welles – Director: Jennifer Welles
1977: The Goodbye Girl – Director: Herbert Ross
1978: Debbie Does Dallas (as Richard Balla) – Director: Jim Clark
1979: For Richer, for Poorer (as Richard Bolla) – Director: Gerard Damiano
1979: Concorde Affaire '79 – Director: Ruggero Deodato
1979: The Concorde ... Airport '79 – Director: David Lowell Rich
1980: The Satisfiers of Alpha Blue (as R. Bolla) – Director: Gerard Damiano
1980: Cannibal Holocaust (Director: Ruggero Deodato)
1980: Eaten Alive! (Director: Umberto Lenzi)
1981: Amanda by Night (as R. Bolla) (Director: Gary Graver)
1981: Debbie Does Dallas Part II (as R. Bolla)
1981: Cannibal Ferox (Director: Umberto Lenzi)
1982: The Devil in Miss Jones Part II (as R. Bolla) (Director: Henri Pachard)
1982: The Clairvoyant (Director: Armand Mastroianni)
1982: Center Spread Girls (as R. Bolla)
1982: Mission Hill (Director: Bob Jones)
1983: Public Affairs (as R. Bolla) (Director: Henri Pachard)
1984: Liquid A$$ets (as R. Bolla)
1984: Death Mask (Director: Richard Friedman)
1985: Hot Blooded (as R. Bolla)
1985: Spitfire (as R. Bolla)
1986: Night of the Creeps (Director: Fred Dekker)
1987: Street Heat (as Richard Bolla)
1987: Corporate Assets (as R. Bolla)
1987: No Way Out (Director: Roger Donaldson)
1998: Men Under Water (Director: Douglas Morse)
2002: Spider-Man (Director: Sam Raimi)
2006: Vic (Director: Sage Stallone)

Awards
 1981 Adult Film Association of America Award – Best Supporting Actor (Outlaw Ladies) tied with Richard Pacheco
 1983 Critics Adult Film Award – Best Supporting Actor (Devil in Miss Jones 2)
 1997 AVN Hall of Fame
 2008 XRCO Hall of Fame

References

External links

 

1947 births
2018 deaths
People from Bensonhurst, Brooklyn
Male actors from New York City
Jewish American male actors
American male pornographic film actors
American male film actors
American male stage actors
Brooklyn College alumni
Lafayette High School (New York City) alumni
21st-century American Jews
Deaths from diabetes